Ophrys lutea, the yellow bee-orchid, is a species of orchid native to Southern Europe, North Africa, and the Middle East, the range extending from Portugal and Morocco to Syria.

Description of the flower 
Broad asymmetric lateral sepals, dorsal sepal lowered.

Extended petals, yellow or with a blue-grey or brown spotted velvety macula. Pollinated by male Andrena bees. This species is notable among Ophrys for the fact that the pollinating bees sit on the labellum facing away from the pollinaria instead of facing towards them, and thus collect the pollinaria with their abdomen.

Subspecies 
Numerous subspecific names have been proposed, but  the following are accepted:

Ophrys lutea subsp. aspea (Devillers-Tersch. & Devillers) Faurh. - Tunisia, Libya
Ophrys lutea subsp. galilaea (H.Fleischm. & Bornm.) Soó - from Portugal and Morocco to Syria
Ophrys lutea subsp. lutea - from Portugal and Morocco to Turkey
Ophrys lutea subsp. melena Renz - Greece, Albania
Ophrys lutea subsp. sicula (Tineo 1817) - Italy

Flowering period 
March to May

Habitat 
The orchid grows in full sun or shade on limey dry or damp soils, pastures, and thin woodland.

from the French Wikipedia; technical translation of some words still needing checking

References

 World Checklist of Monocotyledons, Kew Botanical gardens

lutea
Orchids of Europe
Flora of Europe
Flora of North Africa
Taxa named by Antonio José Cavanilles